The John H. Chafee Blackstone River Valley National Heritage Corridor is a National Heritage Corridor dedicated to the history of the early American Industrial Revolution, including mill towns stretching across 24 cities and towns (400,000 acres (1,620 km²) in total) near the river's course in Worcester County, Massachusetts and Providence County, Rhode Island. It makes up a historical area in the Blackstone Valley and is named for the late US Senator from Rhode Island John Chafee. In 2014, the Blackstone River Valley National Historical Park was created out of a smaller portion of the National Heritage Corridor. Both units now exist as cooperative entities.   The organization is headquartered at the building in Woonsocket Depot Square which is located at 1 Depot Square, Woonsocket, RI 02895.

History

The National Corridor was designated by an Act of Congress on November 10, 1986 to preserve and interpret for present and future generations the unique and significant value of the Blackstone Valley. It includes cities, towns, villages and almost one million people. The Federal government does not own or manage any of the land or resources in the corridor as it does in the more traditional national parks. Instead the National Park Service, two state governments, dozens of local municipalities, businesses, nonprofit historical and environmental organizations, educational institutions, many private citizens, and a Blackstone River Valley National Heritage Corridor Commission all work together in partnerships to protect the Valley's special identity and prepare for its future.

The Blackstone River Greenway is a planned  paved rail trail defining the course of the East Coast Greenway through the National Corridor.

On October 12, 2006 the National Heritage Areas Act of 2006 was signed by the President, enacting it as Public Law Number 109-338.  This legislation extends the Corridor Commission for five years until October 12, 2011.

On July 18, 2011 a report recommended the corridor for national park status.

Visitor centers
 Blackstone Valley Visitor Center, Pawtucket, Rhode Island (operated by the Blackstone Valley Tourism Council)
 Museum of Work and Culture, Woonsocket, Rhode Island (operated by the Rhode Island Historical Society)
 River Bend Farm Visitor Center at Blackstone River and Canal Heritage State Park, Uxbridge, Massachusetts (operated by Massachusetts Department of Conservation and Recreation)
 Broad Meadow Brook Sanctuary, Worcester, Massachusetts (operated by the Massachusetts Audubon Society)
 Blackstone River Valley National Heritage Corridor Visitor Center, Worcester, Massachusetts (operated by the Blackstone Heritage Corridor, Inc.)

Corridor cities and towns

Note: In some cases, only a portion of the city or town is included in the Corridor.

Massachusetts

Rhode Island

See also
 Greater Worcester Land Trust

References

External links
 Official NPS site
 Legislative History of National Corridor
 Blackstone Valley Institute (planning resources)
 Blackstone River Valley Corridor Keepers (preservation group)
 Highway of Commerce: The Blackstone Canal, Worcester Historical Museum, 2005
 Historic American Buildings Survey

1986 establishments in the United States
National Heritage Areas of the United States
Protected areas established in 1986